Niklas is a male name, most common in Sweden and the Swedish-speaking population of Finland. It is also used as a surname. Notable people with that name include:

Given name 
Niklas (singer), Danish singer-songwriter
Niklas Almqvist, Swedish guitarist and backup vocalist of the Swedish Garage Rock band The Hives
Niklas Andersen, Swedish football defender who plays for Werder Bremen
Niklas Andersson, Swedish ice hockey player currently playing for Frölunda HC
Niklas Bäckström, Finnish ice hockey goaltender currently playing for the Tappara in the Finnish SM-Liiga
Niklas Edin, Swedish curler
Niklas Eriksson, Swedish Olympic Ice hockey player
Niklas Hagman, Finnish ice hockey forward currently playing for the HPK in the Finnish SMLiiga
Niklas Hjalmarsson, Swedish ice hockey defenceman currently playing for the Chicago Blackhawks
Niklas Hogner, Swedish figure skater
Niklas Karlsson (born 1974), Swedish politician
Niklas Kiel, German basketball player
Niklas Klingberg, Swedish motorcycle speedway rider
Niklas Kronwall, Swedish ice hockey defenceman currently playing for the Detroit Red Wings in the NHL
Niklas Kvarforth, Swedish musician, composer and vocalist of the black metal band Shining
Niklas Landin, Danish handball player 
Niklas Luhmann, German sociologist
Niklas Mattsson, Swedish ice hockey player
Niklas Meinert, German field hockey midfielder
Niklas Moisander, Finnish footballer currently playing for German team Werder Bremen
Niklas Nordgren, Swedish ice hockey player
Niklas Sandberg, Swedish football player
Niklas Skoog, Swedish football striker
Niklas Strömstedt, Swedish pop singer and songwriter
Niklas Süle, German footballer
Niklas Sundblad, Swedish ice hockey player
Niklas Sundin, Swedish guitarist of Dark Tranquillity and Laethora
Niklas Sundström, Swedish ice hockey player
Niklas Tarvajärvi, Finnish footballer striker currently playing for Karlsruher SC
Niklas Willén, Swedish conductor
Niklas Zennström, Swedish entrepreneur

Surname 
Wilhelm Niklas (1887–1957), German academic and politician

Swedish masculine given names
Finnish masculine given names